City Club may refer to:

American civic organizations
Capital City Club (est. 1883) in Atlanta, Georgia
City Club of Chicago (est. 1903) in Illinois
City Club of Cleveland (est. 1912) in Ohio
City Club of New York (est. 1892) in New York
City Club of Portland (est. 1916) in Oregon
Women's City Club (disambiguation), multiple organizations

Other
City Club (wholesale club), a Mexican retailer
Berkeley City Club, a historic building in Berkeley, California
City Club (album), a 2016 album by the California rock band The Growlers
City Club (cricket), a cricket club in Mirpur, Bangladesh

See also
City FC (disambiguation)